The United States Virgin Islands, also known as the Virgin Islands and officially as the Virgin Islands of the United States, competed at the 2020 Summer Olympics in Tokyo. Originally scheduled to take place from 24 July to 9 August 2020, the Games were postponed to 23 July to 8 August 2021, because of the COVID-19 pandemic. It was the territory's thirteenth appearance at the Summer Olympics.

Competitors
The following is the list of number of competitors in the Games.

Archery

Virgin Islands has received one tripartite invitation quotas from World Archery.

Athletics

Virgin Islands received a universality slot from the World Athletics to send a male track and field athlete to the Olympics.

Track & road events

Swimming

Virgin Islands received a universality invitation from FINA to send two top-ranked swimmers (one per gender) in their respective individual events to the Olympics, based on the FINA Points System of June 28, 2021.

See also
Virgin Islands at the 2019 Pan American Games

References

External links
 United States Virgin Islands at the 2020 Summer Olympics at Olympedia

Nations at the 2020 Summer Olympics
2020

2020 in United States Virgin Islands sports